The 2021 PEI Tankard, the men's provincial curling championship for Prince Edward Island, was held from January 29 to 30 at the Maple Leaf Curling Club in O'Leary, Prince Edward Island. The winning Eddie MacKenzie rink represented Prince Edward Island at the 2021 Tim Hortons Brier in Calgary, Alberta where they finished with a  1–7 record. The event was held in conjunction with the 2021 Prince Edward Island Scotties Tournament of Hearts, the provincial women's championship.

Due to the COVID-19 pandemic in Canada, many teams could not commit to the quarantine process in order to compete at the national championship. Only two teams, Blair Jay from the Silver Fox Curling Club and Eddie MacKenzie from the Crapaud Community Curling Club and Montague Curling Club entered the event. Team MacKenzie won the best of five series in just three games.

Teams
The teams are listed as follows:

Results
All draw times are listed in Atlantic Time (UTC−04:00).

Standings
Final Standings

Draw 1
Friday, January 29, 4:00 pm

Draw 2
Saturday, January 30, 11:00 am

Draw 3
Saturday, January 30, 4:00 pm

References

External links

Prince Edward Island
Curling competitions in Prince Edward Island
January 2021 sports events in Canada
2021 in Prince Edward Island
Prince County, Prince Edward Island